WD repeat domain 91 is a protein that in humans is encoded by the WDR91 gene.

References

Further reading